Kasun Nadika Jayasuriya (born 25 March 1980) is a retired Sri Lankan football player who last played for Saunders Sports Club and the Sri Lanka national football team. He is also the all-time top goalscorer for the Sri Lankan national team with 27 goals in 56 caps.

Club career
Jayasuriya began his professional club career at Renown SC in 2000.

He became the top-scorer of Sri Lanka's Kit Premier League, having scored 21 goals. He previously played at the National Football League for two Indian club; Indian Bank RC, and Dempo SC.

International career
Jayasuriya represented Sri Lanka internationally and is the all time goal scorer for Sri Lanka in international football history with 27 goals.

Career statistics

International goals

Scores and results list the Sri Lanka's goal tally first.

Honours
Sri Lanka
 AFC Challenge Cup: 2006
ANFA Cup runner-up: 2009

References

External links

1980 births
Living people
Sri Lankan footballers
Sri Lanka international footballers
Association football forwards
Dempo SC players
Renown SC players
saunders SC players
Sri Lanka Football Premier League players
Sri Lankan expatriate footballers
Expatriate footballers in India
Sri Lankan expatriate sportspeople in India